Dhapakhel is a town in Lalitpur District in the Bagmati Zone of central Nepal. At the time of the 1991 Nepal census it had a population of 4591 in 857 individual households. At the eastern part of Dhapakhel the Kantipur Engineering College is located.

Nagdaha, GEMS school, ICIMOD, Sumeru Hospital are situated in Dhapakhel.

References

External links
UN map of the municipalities of Lalitpur District

Populated places in Lalitpur District, Nepal